Order Political Party was a minor conservative Peruvian political party. Founded in July 2014 by former  Defense Minister, Ántero Flores Aráoz, he was nominated for the Presidency in the 2016 general election.

At the general election held on April 10, 2016, the party's ticket won 0.4% of the popular vote, placing tenth and last. At parliamentary level, the party won 0.6% and no seats in the Congress of the Republic. The party was subsequently cancelled by the National Elections Jury in July 2017 along other parties that failed to pass the electoral threshold.

Election results

Presidential election

Elections to the Congress of the Republic

References

Defunct political parties in Peru
Conservative parties in Peru